Anton Coşa (born November 23, 1961) is a Romanian cleric, bishop of the Roman Catholic Diocese of Chişinău in Moldova.

Early life
Anton Coșa was born on November 23, 1961 in a family of farmers, in the village of Valea Mare in the Faraoani commune, then located in the Bacău County. His family also gave two other priest brothers, Fr. Eduard Coșa from Bacău and Fr. Francisc Coșa from Bucharest. He attended primary school in his native village, and then high school in Hemeiuș commune in Bacău County.

Biography
In 1989, he graduated from the Roman Catholic Theological Institute of Iași, and that June was ordained a priest by Bucharest Archbishop Ioan Robu, for the Iaşi Diocese. From 1989 to 1990, he was the assistant priest at Roman, and from 1990 to 1991 in Chişinău. 

In 1991, he became the parish priest, remaining there until he was named Apostolic Administrator for Moldova in 1993. In October 1999, Pope John Paul II named him as the titular bishop of Paestum, later consecrating him at Saint Peter's Basilica the following January. He was named as the inaugural Bishop of Chişinău in 2001.

References

External Links
 Catholic-Hierarchy

Moldovan Roman Catholic bishops
20th-century Roman Catholic titular bishops
Romanian expatriates in Moldova
Living people
1961 births
People from Bacău County